WJCW (910 AM) is a commercial radio station, licensed to Johnson City, Tennessee and serving the Tri-Cities radio market (Johnson City-Bristol-Kingsport).  It is owned by Cumulus Media and airs a talk radio format.

WJCW's transmitter, offices and studios are on Free Hill Road in Gray, Tennessee.  The complex also houses the studios for Cumulus' other Tri-Cities radio stations.  WJCW broadcasts with a 5,000 watt non-directional signal in the daytime.  But at night, to protect other stations on AM 910, the station reduces power to 1,000 watts and uses a directional antenna.  The station is East Tennessee's AM primary entry point station for the Emergency Alert System, with WJXB-FM in Knoxville performing the PEP function on FM in east Tennessee.

History
On December 13, 1938, the station first signed on as WJHL-AM, jointly owned by Hanes Lancaster, Sr. and J. W. Birdwell, both from Chattanooga.  It was the second radio station in the Tri-Cities and the first in Johnson City.  It began broadcasting at only 250 watts.  During 1940, Birdwell was no longer a partner in the new station. 

The station's original frequency was 1200khz. In December of 1940, WJHL moved to 880khz at 1000 watts, with a directional three-tower pattern at night.  Then a short time later in 1941, the station was required to move to 910khz due to the adoption of the new international radio treaty.

In 1942, WJHL got a power boost to its current 5,000 watts by day, 1,000 watts at night, and became an affiliate of the NBC Blue Network, later ABC.  By 1956, WJHL joined CBS, an affiliation that lasted five decades.  Under  Hanes Lancaster, Sr and son Hanes Jr., WJHL added 100.7 WJHL-FM in 1948 (now 101.5 WQUT) and in 1953 added WJHL-TV Channel 11.  Because the AM station carried CBS programming, WJHL-TV became a CBS-TV affiliate.

In 1960, the radio stations were sold to Tri-Cities Broadcasting, owned by James C. Wilson (son of the founder of the area's first radio station, WOPI)  Channel 11 kept the WJHL-TV call letters, while AM 910 was renamed WJCW after Wilson's initials and continued to program a MOR, full service format. In the early 1970s, the station switched to a country music format.

Notable announcers included:

 Eddie Cowell
 Dr. Herb Howard: Announcer, who went on to be Dean/Professor at the University of Tennessee College of Communication & Information after a stint as staff announcer at WJHL-TV.
 Professor Kingfish (Bill Marrs) and Little Richard (Dick Ellis), weekdays 630-7AM.  During the 60s and 70s the show had a large listenership due to the light-hearted banter between the two.  Due to health challenges, Bill Marrs would do the show from home, while Dick Ellis was at the studios.
 Dick Ellis (Little Richard): Morning Drive, News Director, Sports Director, and sports play-by-play. Dick originally served as news and sports anchor for both WJHL radio and television.  In 1960 when the station was purchased and changed to WJCW, he chose to stay with radio.  In 1973, Dick (Richard F. Ellis) became the General Manager of WETS-FM, the public/NPR station owned by East Tennessee State University.  Dick retired from WETS in 1991. In 1993, a few weeks before his death, the new WETS studios were dedicated in his honor.
 Charlie B (Philip Beale): Program Director, Middays, and Afternoon Drive
 Bill Cramer: Nighttime announcer. In the 60s and 70s, WJCW's music would shift from MOR to Rock at 7PM.  After WJCW changed to a country format, Cramer was also a well-known talent on sister-station WQUT
 Larry Hinkle
 Dave Hogan: Morning Drive
 Bill Williams
 Yankee Dave: Middays
 Tom Phillips: Afternoon Drive
 Art Countiss: News Director
 Red Pitcher: News/Sports Director

Jim Wilson/Tri-Cities Broadcasting sold WJCW and WQUT to Bloomington Broadcasting in 1981.

The original studios were located in downtown Johnson City.  The transmitter site was on Princeton Road in North Johnson City.  In 1977, new studios and transmitter site were built in Gray TN. The new location allowed the station's signal to cover a larger area, especially north of Johnson City, plus delivering a better signal to Kingsport.

In the 1980s, listeners began shifting to FM radio for music, so in 1990, WJCW became the Tri-Cities' first news/talk station.  

In 2000, the station was sold to Citadel Broadcasting, a forerunner of Cumulus.

Programming
Weekdays begin with a local news and information show called Thinking Out Loud with hosts Elic Thomas and Carl Swann.  Elic Thomas was hired late in 2021 after Co-host Tim Cable died due to complications from Covid-19. The rest of the weekday schedule is made up of nationally syndicated talk shows, including Dan Bongino, Chris Plante, Ben Shapiro, Mark Levin, Michael J. Knowles, "Red Eye Radio" and "America in The Morning."

Weekend programming includes shows on money, health, cars and other topics, some of which are paid brokered programming.  NASCAR races are also broadcast. Most hours begin with world and national news from ABC News Radio.

References

External links
WJCW official website

JCW
News and talk radio stations in the United States
Cumulus Media radio stations